'Kaliti Prison is a maximum security prison in Addis Ababa, Ethiopia. Commonly referred to as a gulag, it serves as the main prison of the country. It is 11 km south of central Addis Ababa, in Akaky Kaliti, the southernmost subcity of the nation's capital.

The original prison compound is a makeshift structure that was built after 1991 when the Derg regime fell and was not intended as a prison. Most of the structures built by 2004 had been built by prisoners by their own means and with help from NGOs.

Description
Part of the prison consists of sheet-metal shacks arranged in a dense maze.

Within the prison there are 8 zones (however zone 8 is not in use according to the recollection of Martin Schibbye). The group Zone 9 bloggers is named after a non-existent ninth zone.

Around 2012, the prison held approximately 8,000 inmates. A 2009 Human Rights League of the Horn of Africa (HRLHA) report described overcrowding in the prison with hundreds of inmates being held in single, poorly ventilated cells. They reported that individuals were exposed to tuberculosis, fleas, lice, that there was a lack of sanitation, that water for drinking and washing was insufficient, that inmates had to sleep on cold, concrete floors, and that access to medical care was nearly absent. They also reported that "complaints against all these human rights violations being severely punishable". Personnel at the prison are known to have tortured inmates.

2016 fire
A fire broke out on 3 September 2016 and continued on until the next day. Prisoners attempted to escape during the chaos, and gunshots were heard. Two prisoners were claimed to have been killed trying to escape, while 21 other inmates were said to have perished from "stampede and suffocation". At least 23 people were killed in total. The fire occurred during the deadly nationwide 2016 Ethiopian protests, and may have been related.

Prisoners

Notable inmates

 Hamza Borana: Oromo Civil, Political and Human Rights activist. Presented incarcerated as a Political Prisoner.

 Colonel Gamachu Ayyanaa: A Colonel in the Ethiopian Army and Oromo Political activist. Presently incarcerated as a Political Prisoner.

Merera Gudina, Oromo human right activist, released in January 2018

 Lammi Begna, an Oromo human right activist and student leader, he was sentenced to 15 years of imprisonment. He was released in October 2013 after completing his terms of prison without parole.

 Aslii Oromo, an OLF army commander and the first female prisoner in history to receive the death penalty. She was released from prison after 18 years of incarceration.  

Siye Abraha, a leader of the Tigrayan People's Liberation Front, spent six years at Kaliti and was released in 2007.

Teddy Afro, aka Tewodros Kassahun, an Ethiopian singer

Reeyot Alemu, Ethiopian journalist

Andualem Aragie, Vice President and Press Secretary for the Unity for Democracy and Justice party

Tesfahun Chemeda, Oromo rights advocate, died in Kaliti

Temesgen Desalegn, Ethiopian journalist

Serkalem Fasil, Ethiopian journalist

Befeqadu Hailu, Ethiopian writer, activist, blogger, and member of the Zone 9 bloggers

Birtukan Mideksa is an Ethiopian politician, former judge, founder and leader of Unity for Democracy and Justice, the opposition party. She was held in a cell measuring 2 x 3 metres that she shared with two others.
Berhanu Nega, Economics professor and politician
Eskinder Nega, Ethiopian journalist and blogger
Martin Schibbye, a Swedish journalist who spent 438 days there with photographer Johan Persson
Hailu Shawul, Ethiopian engineer and chairman of the Coalition for Unity and Democracy
Woubshet Taye, Ethiopian journalist
Asaminew Tsige, retired Brigadier-General in the Ethiopian Air Force
Mesfin Woldemariam, Ethiopian academician and peace activist
Ingela Jansson, Swedish female, who spent 8 years at Kaliti. She was sentenced to 55 years for fraud.

Layout

See also
 Human rights in Ethiopia

References

External links
 Images of Kaliti Prison:
 The Kality Foundation, formed to offer financial help to reporters and photographers who are held in prison
 List of political prisoners at Kaliti
 Another list of political prisoners at Kaliti
Censorship in Ethiopia - IFEX
 2012 Annual Report, by Amnesty International
 Freedom in the World 2012 Report, by Freedom House
 World Report 2012, by Human Rights Watch
 Ethiopia after Meles: Democracy and Human Rights: Hearing before the Subcommittee on Africa, Global Health, Global Human Rights, and International Organizations of the Committee on Foreign Affairs, House of Representatives, One Hundred Thirteenth Congress, First Session, June 20, 2013

Prisons in Ethiopia
Buildings and structures in Addis Ababa